Ignatius Hidayat Allah was the Patriarch of Antioch and head of the Syriac Orthodox Church from 1597/1598 until his death in 1639/1640.

Biography
Hidayat Allah was born to an illustrious family which had produced several patriarchs, including his uncles Ignatius Nimat Allah and Ignatius David II Shah, and also Ignatius John XIV. His father Constantine was the son of Hissin and John, son of Muglah and Nūr al-Dīn. Through Nūr al-Dīn, Hidayat was descended from Mary and Šay Allāh, son of Sa‘d al-Dīn; his paternal ancestors had moved from Bartella, near Mosul, to Mardin in the mid-14th century, and were descended from the priest Abū al-Karam, who lived in the thirteenth or fourteenth centuries.

He became a monk and student under his uncle Ignatius David II Shah, who appointed him as patriarchal deputy in Mardin in 1591. After David's death and succession by Ignatius Pilate in the same year, Hidayat quarrelled with Pilate and was supported by his uncle Timothy Thomas. The dispute continued until the two were reconciled through the efforts of Gregory Vaness of Wank of the House of Najjar, bishop of Cappadocia and then Edessa, in 1593.

In 1597, Hidayat was ordained as Maphrian of the East, upon which he assumed the name Basil, and subsequently succeeded Pilate as patriarch of Antioch in 1597 or 1598, assuming the name Ignatius. He ordained John Stephen as archbishop of the monastery of Qartmin in 1627. Hidayat served as patriarch of Antioch until his death in 1639 or 1640.

References
Notes

Citations

Bibliography

Syriac Patriarchs of Antioch from 512 to 1783
1639 deaths
1640 deaths
Year of birth unknown
16th-century Oriental Orthodox archbishops
16th-century births
Assyrians from the Ottoman Empire
Maphrians
Oriental Orthodox bishops in the Ottoman Empire
16th-century people from the Ottoman Empire
17th-century people from the Ottoman Empire
17th-century Oriental Orthodox archbishops